Tobias Regner (born 5 August 1982) is a German singer and guitarist who has enjoyed success in the rock music genre. He made his debut under major label Sony BMG Domestic after he won the highly publicized third season of the television series Deutschland sucht den Superstar, the German version of Pop Idol, in 2006.

Musical career

2005–2006: Deutschland sucht den Superstar 

After his graduation from University of Salzburg, Regner auditioned for the third installment of the reality television program Deutschland sucht den Superstar. He entered the competition with 14,000 others, and the judges Dieter Bohlen, Heinz Henn and Sylvia Kollek were impressed with his voice and unconventional style. After several "re-calls" and week-by-week performances, Regner earned a position in the Top 10 finalists, eventually making it to the final two contestants on Deutschland sucht den Superstar, and on 18 March 2006, he won the competition and earned 54.6% of the audience vote over Mike Leon Grosch, making him the first rock artist to win the show, before Thomas Godoj won the competition in 2008. Overwhelmed, Regner performed his "exclusive" song "I Still Burn", a rock-ballad written by Peter Wright and Jess Cates. When released as a single via Sony BMG Domestic on 14 March 2006, it instantly entered the charts at No. 1 in Austria, Germany, and Switzerland, simultaneously emerging as the biggest-selling single since 2004 within its first week of release. The song was eventually certified platinum by the IFPI for more than 300,000 copies sold.

Following the successful release of "I Still Burn", Regner's full-length debut album Straight was released on 28 April 2006. American producers Max Martin and Desmond Child consulted on the album which debuted at number one on the German Media Control 100 and also peaked within the Top 5 in Austria, and the Top 20 in Switzerland. Eventually, the album was certified gold by the IFPI for sales of more than 100,000 copies. Reviews for the album were generally favorable, with LAUT'''s critic Dani Fromm praising the "versatile, powerful-voiced and likeable" character of Regner's music, and others calling it "unidirectional" but "positive", comparing it to Jon Bon Jovi. However, further singles – "She's So" and the Open Season theme song "Cool Without You" – failed to chart or sell noticeably. Regner was dropped eventually from his record label.

Discography

 Albums 
 Straight (2006) GER: #1 AT: #5 CH: #14
 Kurz unsterblich (2010)
 Akustisch'' (2011)

Singles

References

External links
 Former group „Plutone“
 Former group „Ge'läck“

1982 births
Living people
Deutschland sucht den Superstar winners
German rock singers
University of Salzburg alumni
19 Recordings artists
21st-century German  male  singers